Garry Don "Donny" Anderson (born May 16, 1943) is a former professional football player, a halfback and punter for nine seasons with the Green Bay Packers and St. Louis Cardinals of the National Football League.

From Texas Tech (then Texas Technological College, now Texas Tech University), Anderson was the first-round draft pick of the Green Bay Packers in the 1965 NFL draft, the seventh overall selection. That year's draft included future hall-of-famers Dick Butkus, Gale Sayers, Joe Namath, and Fred Biletnikoff.

Early years
Born in Borger, Texas,  Anderson grew up in Stinnett, seat of Hutchinson County in the Texas Panhandle, and graduated from Stinnett High School in 1961. A talented multi-sport athlete, he was all-state in football and basketball, placed in the state track meet (hurdles and relay) and played baseball in the summer.

College career
At Texas Tech in Lubbock, Anderson earned the nickname the "Golden Palomino". He received All-American honors twice (1964 and 1965) and was a three-time all-Southwest Conference halfback (1963–65). Anderson held many of Texas Tech's football records and finished fourth in the 1965 Heisman Trophy race. He is part of the Texas Tech Hall of Fame and the College Football Hall of Fame.

Because of a redshirt year due to academic issues, Anderson was eligible as underclassman for the 1965 NFL Draft, then known as a "future" pick. In 1964, he ran for 966 yards with three touchdowns (TDs) and had 32 catches for 396 yards and four TDs; Despite being selected by the Packers, he returned for his senior season at Texas Tech in 1965 and led the Red Raiders to an 8-2 regular season and a berth in the Gator Bowl on the afternoon of New Year's Eve. As a senior, he ran for 705 yards with 10 TDs and had 60 catches for 797 yards and seven TDs.

Selected the outstanding player for Texas Tech in a 10-point loss to Georgia Tech, Anderson signed his professional football contract hours after the game. He selected the Packers over the reportedly higher offer from the Houston Oilers of the AFL. His contract was believed to be a then-record $600,000, exceeding Joe Namath's contract of the previous year.

Professional career
Anderson began his NFL career in 1966 as #44 for the world-champion Packers. Fellow All-American Jim Grabowski, a fullback from Illinois, was the Packers' first pick in the 1966 NFL Draft, and ninth overall. The well-paid pair were the projected successors of Paul Hornung and Jim Taylor, future hall of famers in their final seasons with Green Bay. The two rookies were on the College All-Star team that lost to the defending NFL champion Packers 38–0 on August 5 at Soldier Field in Chicago. They joined the Packers' training camp after the game, and were tabbed the "Gold Dust Twins."

Though he did not carry the ball often as a rookie, Anderson was part of a memorable play. During his second carry in the fourth quarter of Super Bowl I, Anderson's knee knocked out Chiefs defensive back Fred "The Hammer" Williamson, who had been boastful in pregame interviews. Williamson was carried off on a stretcher.  Anderson also served as the team's return specialist that year, returning 6 punts for 124 yards and a touchdown, along with 23 kickoff returns for 533 yards.

In the following season, Anderson took on a far more prominent role in the Packers offense, gaining 733 yards from scrimmage, catching 22 passes, and scoring 9 touchdowns, while also gaining another 324 yards returning kicks.  The Packers went on to second consecutive championship win in Super Bowl II, where Anderson was the team's second leading rusher with 48 yards and a touchdown, while also catching 2 passes for 18 yards.  He also punted the ball six times for 239 yards.  One of his punts was fumbled, which the Packers recovered and were able to convert it into a field goal just before the end of the first half.

After six seasons in Green Bay under three head coaches, Anderson was traded in February  to the St. Louis Cardinals for  Anderson played through the 1974 season with the Cardinals, then was traded to the Miami Dolphins in the offseason. At age 32, he recognized that his prospects for playing time were low, and retired during training camp in 

Anderson finished his career with 4,696 rushing yards, 209 receptions for 2,548 yards, 15 punt returns for 222 yards, and 34 kickoff returns for 759 yards.  He scored 56 total touchdowns (41 rushing, 14 receiving, 1 punt return).

Punter
While with the Packers under head coach Vince Lombardi, Anderson originated the concept of hang time in punting. Until Anderson, punters typically strove for maximum distance, with the NFL's leaders usually averaging 45 or more yards a punt. Punt returns varied, with an average of perhaps 5 yards per return. In 1967, the left-footed Anderson worked instead at punting the ball higher, shortening the distance traveled, but increasing the ball's time in the air, allowing better coverage by his team on the punt return. Green Bay punted 66 times that year, 63 of them by Anderson; opponents were able to return only 13 of them for a total of 22 yards, or about one-third yard (one foot) per punt.

Anderson had a total of 387 punts for 1,526 yards.

Lombardi explained the concept to sportswriters who questioned why he did not try to find a better punter than Anderson, who averaged only 36.6 yards per punt that year. Lombardi pointed out the lack of return yardage. Other punters soon followed Anderson, working for greater hang time. Eventually, the NFL changed its rules governing punt coverage, to restore the ability to return punts.

After football
Following his retirement from the NFL, Anderson spent nearly two decades on the celebrity golf tour. As of 2017, Anderson lives in the Dallas area and stays busy with 10 grandchildren and his Dallas-based foundation, Winners for Life, that helps send at-risk kids to college.

References

External links
 Winners for Life – Anderson's foundation – college scholarships for at-risk youth
 
 

1943 births
Living people
American football punters
American football return specialists
American football running backs
Green Bay Packers players
St. Louis Cardinals (football) players
Texas Tech Red Raiders football players
All-American college football players
College Football Hall of Fame inductees
Western Conference Pro Bowl players
People from Borger, Texas
Players of American football from Texas